First-seeded Nancye Bolton defeated Marie Toomey 6–3, 6–1 in the final to win the women's singles tennis title at the 1948 Australian Championships.

Seeds
The seeded players are listed below. Nancye Bolton is the champion; others show the round in which they were eliminated.

 Nancye Bolton (champion)
 Thelma Long (second round)
 Mary Bevis (semifinals)
 Marie Toomey (finalist)
 Pat Jones (second round)
 Nell Hopman (quarterfinals)
 Sadie Newcombe (second round)
 Dulcie Whittaker (first round)

Draw

Key
 Q = Qualifier
 WC = Wild card
 LL = Lucky loser
 r = Retired

Finals

Earlier rounds

Section 1

Section 2

External links
 

1948 in women's tennis
1948
1948 in Australian tennis
1948 in Australian women's sport